In enzymology, a gibberellin beta-D-glucosyltransferase is an enzyme that catalyzes the chemical reaction

UDP-glucose + gibberellin  UDP + gibberellin 2-O-beta-D-glucoside

Thus, the two substrates of this enzyme are UDP-glucose and gibberellin, whereas its two products are UDP and gibberellin 2-O-beta-D-glucoside.

This enzyme belongs to the family of glycosyltransferases, specifically the hexosyltransferases.  The systematic name of this enzyme class is UDP-glucose:gibberellin 2-O-beta-D-glucosyltransferase. Other names in common use include uridine diphosphoglucose-gibberellate 7-glucosyltransferase, and uridine diphosphoglucose-gibberellate 3-O-glucosyltransferase.

References

 

EC 2.4.1
Enzymes of unknown structure